Beckeria horni is a species of beetle in the family Carabidae, the only species in the genus Beckeria.

References

Platyninae